Macrhybopsis, the blacktail chubs, is a genus of cyprinid fish that are found in North America.  There are currently 12 species in this genus.

Species 
 Macrhybopsis aestivalis (Girard, 1856) (speckled chub)
 Macrhybopsis australis (C. L. Hubbs & Ortenburger, 1929) (prairie chub)
 Macrhybopsis boschungi  Gilbert & Mayden, 2017
 Macrhybopsis etnieri  Gilbert & Mayden, 2017
 Macrhybopsis gelida (Girard, 1856) (sturgeon chub)
 Macrhybopsis hyostoma (C. H. Gilbert, 1884) (shoal chub)
 Macrhybopsis marconis (D. S. Jordan & C. H. Gilbert, 1886) (burrhead chub)
 Macrhybopsis meeki (D. S. Jordan & Evermann, 1896) (sicklefin chub)
 Macrhybopsis pallida  Gilbert & Mayden, 2017
 Macrhybopsis storeriana (Kirtland, 1845) (silver chub)
 Macrhybopsis tetranema (C. H. Gilbert, 1886) (peppered chub, Arkansas River speckled chub)
 Macrhybopsis tomellerii  Gilbert & Mayden, 2017

References 
 

 
Taxa named by Theodore Dru Alison Cockerell
Freshwater fish genera
Ray-finned fish genera
Taxonomy articles created by Polbot